Small Drum Corps Association (SDCA), was founded in 2007 to develop venues for smaller drum and bugle corps to perform and compete.

About 
SDCA provides venues for smaller drum corps to perform and potentially compete. The association welcomes concert and parade-only corps, as well as active members of Drum Corps International or Drum Corps Associates. Membership is open, meaning any group that performs at a hosted event is considered a member of the association. Drum lines, color guards and marching bands are not excluded.

Sanctioned events are often hosted in conjunction with community events, such as parades and festivals. Emphasis is placed on audience engagement and entertainment. Scoring, if available, features spectator input.

Like DCI and other associations, SDCA pays appearance fees to participating groups.

See also 
 Drum Corps Associates
 Drum Corps International
 Mid-America Competing Band Directors Association

References

External links
 

Drum and bugle corps
 
2007 establishments in the United States